Bundesautobahn 448 is an autobahn in the Ruhr. It will connect the A40 in the west of Bochum with the section of the former A44 (also run as BAB 448 since 1 January 2017) in the east of Bochum in the so-called "Bochum solution" and relieve the parallel A40.

References

External links 

448
A448
Transport in Bochum